Eiam Harssarungsri (born 15 July 1939) is a Thai judoka. He competed in the men's lightweight event at the 1964 Summer Olympics.

References

1939 births
Living people
Eiam Harssarungsri
Eiam Harssarungsri
Judoka at the 1964 Summer Olympics
Place of birth missing (living people)
Eiam Harssarungsri